Wright is an unincorporated community in Ford County, Kansas, United States.  As of the 2020 census, the population of the community and nearby areas was 145.

History
Wright is named for Robert M. Wright, a member of the Kansas House of Representatives from 1875 to 1883 and one of the founders and early mayors of Dodge City.

Geography

Climate
The climate in this area is characterized by hot, humid summers and generally mild to cool winters.  According to the Köppen Climate Classification system, Wright has a humid subtropical climate, abbreviated "Cfa" on climate maps.

Demographics

For statistical purposes, the United States Census Bureau has defined Wright as a census-designated place (CDP).

Government
Wright has a post office with ZIP code 67882.

Education
The community is served by Dodge City USD 443 public school district.

References

Further reading

External links
 Ford County maps: Current, Historic - KDOT

Census-designated places in Ford County, Kansas
Census-designated places in Kansas